Heikintori is a shopping centre in Tapiola, Espoo, Finland.

Heikintori is the second oldest shopping centre in the entire country of Finland. It includes many shops including clothes and electronics shops, many restaurants, and a barber's shop.

There are about 187,000 inhabitants in Heikintori's sphere of influence. The number of households is about 81,000. The annual consumption power of the area is almost 3.1 billion euro (2006).

Figures
 Built in 1968/1978
 Area for rent: 9,500 m2
 Car parking spaces: 258, of which 258 covered
 Number of businesses: 46, including KappAhl, Aleksi 13, Andiamo, K-Kenkä and Kelloliike Sylvester
 Percentage of Citycon's ownership: 61.5%

Future

Heikintori has long been in need for renovation. Part of Heikintori belongs to the environment designed by Aarne Ervi, which falls under protection. The renovation was supposed to start in late 2019 and be completed in 2021. The plans included building four floors of apartments on top of Heikintori and dismantling Heikintori's current parking house and replacing it with a 7-floor residential house. The commercial spaces were supposed to be renovated honouring the spirit of Aarne Ervi and not be expanded. The third floor of Heikintori will probably house a kindergarten, and part of Heikintori's roof will act as the kindergarten's yard.

In 2020, Heikintori only had a few stores left, including two restaurants, a bar, a barber's shop and a flea market. The only surviving original store is restaurant Ribis.

References

Shopping centres in Espoo
Tapiola